The Certificate Management over CMS (CMC) is an Internet Standard published by the IETF, defining transport mechanisms for the Cryptographic Message Syntax (CMS).

Similarly to the Certificate Management Protocol (CMP), it can be used for obtaining X.509 digital certificates in a public key infrastructure (PKI).

As such, EST can play a similar role to SCEP.

See also
 Certificate Management Protocol (CMP)
 Simple Certificate Enrollment Protocol (SCEP)
 Enrollment over Secure Transport (EST)
 Automated Certificate Management Environment (ACME)
Public key infrastructure
Cryptographic protocols
Internet Standards
Internet protocols